Mikah Meyer is an American travel journalist and LGBTQ rights advocate. On April 29, 2019, he became the first person to visit all 419 U.S. National Parks in a single journey. Meyer posted updates of his travels on Instagram. His trip was funded largely by donations collected at churches along the way where he sang and spoke aiming to spread a message of LGBTQ-inclusive Christianity. Meyer was recognized by NBC Out's #Pride50 as one of 20 veterans of the LGBTQ movement. Meyers is from Lincoln, Nebraska. His father was a Lutheran preacher. Meyer founded the group Queers for Christ.

References

External links
 

Living people
Year of birth missing (living people)
Place of birth missing (living people)
LGBT people from Nebraska
American LGBT rights activists
Activists from Nebraska
American gay men
American Lutherans
21st-century Lutherans
20th-century Lutherans
People from Lincoln, Nebraska
Christians from Nebraska
LGBT Lutherans
21st-century American LGBT people